Thomas "Pinky" Ward was an American Negro league outfielder in the 1920s and 1930s.

A native of Atlantic City, New Jersey, Ward made his Negro leagues debut in 1923 with the Washington Potomacs. He went on to play for several teams, including the Chicago American Giants and Memphis Red Sox, and finished his career in 1934 with the Cincinnati Tigers.

References

External links
 and Baseball-Reference Black Baseball stats and Seamheads

Place of death missing
Year of birth missing
Year of death missing
Birmingham Black Barons players
Chicago American Giants players
Cincinnati Tigers (baseball) players
Indianapolis ABCs players
Louisville Black Caps players
Memphis Red Sox players
Washington Potomacs players
Sportspeople from Atlantic City, New Jersey